William "Bill" McCadney (5 February 1935 in  Brooklyn, New York – 2 April 2009 in Arecibo, Puerto Rico) was a Puerto Rican basketball player who competed in the 1964 Summer Olympics and in the 1968 Summer Olympics. He was born in Brooklyn, New York and played college basketball at Fordham.

References

External links
 

1935 births
2009 deaths
Sportspeople from Brooklyn
Basketball players from New York City
Puerto Rican men's basketball players
1963 FIBA World Championship players
1967 FIBA World Championship players
Olympic basketball players of Puerto Rico
Basketball players at the 1964 Summer Olympics
Basketball players at the 1968 Summer Olympics
Basketball players at the 1963 Pan American Games
Basketball players at the 1967 Pan American Games
Pan American Games medalists in basketball
Pan American Games bronze medalists for Puerto Rico
Medalists at the 1963 Pan American Games
Fordham Rams men's basketball players